Tschick (English: Goodbye Berlin) is a 2016 German comedy-drama film directed by Fatih Akın, based on Wolfgang Herrndorf's bestselling 2010 novel Tschick (released as Why We Took the Car in English-speaking countries). The film depicts two teenage outsiders from Berlin who steal a car and go on an eccentric roadtrip through Eastern Germany during the summer holidays. Tschick received mostly positive reviews in Germany.

Cast
 Tristan Göbel as Maik Klingenberg
 Anand Batbileg as Andrej "Tschick" Tschichatschow
 Nicole Mercedes Müller as Isa Schmidt
 Aniya Wendel as Tatjana Cosic
 Anja Schneider as Maik's mother
 Uwe Bohm as Maik's father
 Xenia Assenza as Mona, father's secretary 
 Udo Samel as Herr Wagenbach, teacher
 Claudia Geisler as Mother of child-rich family
 Marc Hosemann as village policeman
 Alexander Scheer as the judge
 Friederike Kempter as Maik's lawyer

External links
 
 
 Official homepage

References

2010s adventure comedy-drama films
2010s coming-of-age comedy-drama films
2010s road comedy-drama films
2016 films
Films directed by Fatih Akin
German adventure comedy-drama films
German coming-of-age comedy-drama films
German road comedy-drama films
2016 comedy films
2016 drama films
2010s German films